Saint Paul is the capital city of the U.S. state of Minnesota and the county seat of Ramsey County. As of the 2000 census, the population was 287,151. The U.S. Census Bureau estimated the city's population at 279,590 in 2008.

Population and age
The U.S. Census Bureau recorded St. Paul's population at 272,235 in the 1990 census. In the 2000 census, the population was recorded at 287,151; however, a 2008 estimate puts the population at 279,590, a decrease of 7,561 people. In contrast, the Minnesota Department of Administration estimated the city's population at 288,055 in 2008, an increase of 904 people.

According to the 2006–2008 American Community Survey conducted by the U.S. Census Bureau, the population was estimated at 269,188. According to the same survey, the age composition was as follows:

 Under 5 years: 7.6%
 5 to 9 years: 6.6%
 10 to 14 years: 6.9%
 15 to 19 years: 7.8%
 20 to 24 years: 8.1%
 25 to 34 years: 14.8%
 35 to 44 years: 14.7%
 45 to 54 years: 14.1%
 55 to 59 years: 5.7%
 60 to 64 years: 3.6%
 65 to 74 years: 4.8%
 75 to 84 years: 3.5%
 85 years and over: 2.0%
 Median age: 33.7 years

Source:

Households and families
According to the 2006–2008 American Community Survey, there were 108,708 households, of which 52.0% were family households and 48.0% were non-family households. Roughly 33.7% were married couples, and 15.7% had children under 18 years present. Roughly 4.7% of the households had a male householder with no wife present, and 13.6% had a female householder with no husband present. Roughly 38.8% of households consisted of a householder living alone, and 9.0% were consisted of a householder 65 years and over living alone. Approximately 28.8% of households consisted of one or more people under 18 years, and 17.9% consisted of one or more people 65 years and over. The average household size was 2.37 and the average family size was 3.29.

Employment, occupation, income, and poverty
According to the 2006–2008 American Community Survey, 70.2% of the population 16 years and over were in the labor force, while 29.8% were not in the labor force. Roughly 70.1% were in the civilian labor force, while 0.1% were in the armed forces.

Of the civilian employed population over 16 years, 41.1% had management, professional, and related occupations, 17.4% had service occupations, 23.9% had sales and office occupations, 0.3% had farming, fishing, and forestry occupations, 5.4% had construction, extraction, maintenance, and repair occupations, and 11.9% had production, transportation, and material moving occupations.

In 2008, the median household income was $46,628, and the median family income was $58,990.

In terms of poverty, 14.4% of all families and 7.1% of married-couple families lived below the poverty line. Of all people, 19.7% lived below the poverty line, including 28.1% of those under 18 years and 13.6% of those over 65 years.

Race and ethnicity
According to the 2006–2008 American Community Survey, the racial composition was as follows:

 White: 66.7% (Non-Hispanic Whites: 61.6%, White Hispanics 5.1%)
 Black or African American: 13.5%
 American Indian or Alaska Native: 0.8%
 Asian: 12.4%
 Native Hawaiian and Other Pacific Islander: 0.0%
 Some other race: 2.9%
 Two or more races: 3.7%
 Hispanic or Latino (of any race): 8.9%

The largest Asian ancestries in St. Paul are as follows:

 "Other Asian": 10.1% (mostly Hmong)
 Asian Indian: 0.6%
 Korean: 0.6%
 Vietnamese: 0.6%
 Chinese: 0.3%
 Filipino: 0.1%
 Japanese: 0.1%

Among St. Paul's multiracial population, people of mixed black and white ancestry made up over 1% of the city's population (1.2%). People of mixed white and American Indian ancestry made up 0.8% of the population; those of mixed white and Asian ancestry made up 0.5% of the population, and people of mixed black and American Indian ancestry made up 0.3% of St. Paul's population. Multiracial Americans made up 3.7% of the total population.

St. Paul's Hispanic and Latino population is predominately Mexican. Hispanics and Latinos make up 8.9% of the city's population, of which 6.6% are of Mexican descent. There is also a small Puerto Rican community making up 0.6% of the population.

Source:

As of 2001, the largest Hmong population in the United States by city is located in St. Paul. As of 2001, the St. Paul Public Schools had 46,000 students, and about one third of them were Hmong.

The eight largest European ancestries in St. Paul are as follows:

 German: 25.9%
 Irish: 13.5%
 Norwegian: 8.8%
 Swedish: 6.6%
 English: 6.4%
 French: 4.0%
 Polish: 3.9%
 Italian: 3.4%

Place of birth and language
Out of the total population of 269,188, 84.6% were native, of which 83.8% were born in the United States and 0.8% were born in Puerto Rico, U.S. island areas, or born abroad to American parents. The remaining 15.4% were foreign-born. Out of the some 41,000 foreign-born, 41.6% were naturalized citizens and 58.4% were non-U.S. citizens. Out of the foreign-born population, Asia was the most common birthplace with 46.4% of foreigners originating from that continent. People born in Latin America and Africa represented 24.3% and 20.5% of the foreign-born population respectively. People born in Europe made up 6.5% of the foreign-born population; those born in other parts of North America represented 2.0% of the foreign-born populace. Lastly, people born in Oceania represented a mere 0.3% of St. Paul's foreign-born population.

In terms of language, 76.5% of St. Paul's population (over 5 years) spoke only English at home. The remaining 23.5% spoke non-English languages at home, of which 12.2% reported speaking English less than "very well". Spanish speakers made up 7.1% of the population; speakers of other Indo-European languages made up 2.1% of the populace. Speakers of Asian languages made up 10.9% of the population. The remaining 3.4% spoke other languages at home.

Source:

References

Saint Paul, Minnesota
Culture of Saint Paul, Minnesota
Saint Paul
Economy of Saint Paul, Minnesota
Geography of Saint Paul, Minnesota